Aschaffenburg (Low Franconian: Aschebersch) is a Landkreis (district) in Bavaria, Germany. It is bounded by (from the west and clockwise) the districts of Darmstadt-Dieburg, Offenbach, Main-Kinzig (all in the state of Hesse), the districts Main-Spessart and Miltenberg, and the town of Aschaffenburg.

History 
The Aschaffenburg history goes back to as far as the year 957. Initially, being a Roman settlement, it came under the authority of the electors of Mainz in 982 and was chartered in 1173. Remains of Roman settlements were found on the river Main. There was a Roman military camp in what is today the municipality of Stockstadt am Main. After the Roman retreat the region became subject to Alemanni and Franks before eventually being a part of the Electorate of Mainz. While the banks of the Main were populated all these centuries, the hills of the Spessart were virtually unsettled until the 13th century.

The districts of Aschaffenburg and Alzenau were established in 1862, half a century after the region was annexed by the state of Bavaria. These districts were merged in 1972 in order to form the present district.

Geography 
The district is located in the extreme northwest of Bavaria and bounded by Hesse on two sides. The Main river forms the western border, though southwest of the town of Aschaffenburg there are also parts on the western river banks incorporated in the district. The south and east of the district extends into the Mittelgebirge Spessart.

The town of Aschaffenburg is not included in the district ( kreisfrei ), but is nonetheless its administrative seat.

The geographic centre of the European Union is located in the District of Aschaffenburg.

Economy
In 2017 (latest data available) the GDP per inhabitant was €33,109. This places the district 60th out of 96 districts (rural and urban) in Bavaria (overall average: €46,698).

Coat of arms 
The coat of arms displays:
 an acorn symbolising the Spessart hills and their dense forests
 the wheel of the electorate of Mainz
 the blue rings of the Echter family, which was a noble family possessing substantial holdings of land in the region

Towns and municipalities 

Towns:
 Alzenau

Municipalities:

 Bessenbach
 Blankenbach
 Dammbach
 Geiselbach
 Glattbach
 Goldbach
 Großostheim
 Haibach
 Heigenbrücken
 Heimbuchenthal
 Heinrichsthal
 Hösbach
 Johannesberg
 Kahl am Main
 Karlstein am Main
 Kleinkahl
 Kleinostheim
 Krombach
 Laufach
 Mainaschaff
 Mespelbrunn
 Mömbris
 Rothenbuch
 Sailauf
 Schöllkrippen
 Sommerkahl
 Stockstadt am Main
 Waldaschaff
 Weibersbrunn
 Westerngrund
 Wiesen

References

External links 

 

 
Districts of Bavaria
Spessart